Sbor may refer to the following villages of Bulgaria:
 Sbor, Kardzhali Province
 Sbor, Pazardzhik Province
 Sborra

See also 
 Zbor